Ania Bukstein (Anya Bukshteyn; born 7 June 1982) is an Israeli actress, singer and pianist, performing in Hebrew, Russian, French and English.

Early life
Bukstein was born as an only child in Moscow, USSR, in 1982, to a family of Russian-Jewish descent. Her parents are both doctors; her mother is a speech-language pathologist, and her father is a neuro-oncologist. Growing up in Moscow, she studied classical piano as a child starting at the age of 5, which she says she studied with a strict discipline common amongst children in the Soviet Union. She and her parents emigrated to Israel in the early 1990s when she was 7 years old, while her grandparents still live in Moscow. She began her acting career at age 12. However, in Israel she gave up her dream of becoming a professional concert pianist.  As a teenager, she attended Telma Yalin Arts High School in Givatayim, Israel.

After her high school graduation, she served as a soldier in the Israeli Air Force Band for two years. After studying French, she then received a scholarship to study in Paris.

Career

Music 
A classically trained pianist, Bukstein performed many songs on piano for the musical telenovela series HaShir Shelanu.   In 2013 released Bukshtein an album of songs she has written, Sunday, featuring eight songs written and composed by her.  The album was produced by Johnny Goldstein, who also co-wrote the song "One Day" from it. The singles featured in the album are "One Day", "No One" and "Seven Minutes".

In June 2017, in collaboration with DJ Ofer Nissim, she released another single, "Boy or Man". She also performs classic Israeli songs, in state and memorial ceremonies, including presenting the official Israel Independence Day broadcast. In addition, she performs with the Israel Philharmonic Orchestra.

Film and television
In 1994, when she was twelve, Bukstein got her first cinematic role and worked alongside Etti Ankri and Shuli Rand and portrayed Anna, the main character in the film Eretz Hadasha (A New Country), a film about a young Holocaust survivor and her difficulties after she moved to Israel in 1950 with her older brother. For her performance on the film she was nominated for an Ophir Award for best actress, she was the youngest actress to be nominated in this category.

In 2003, she appeared in Dover Kosashvili's Matana MiShamayim. In 2005, she co-starred in the Shmuel Hasfari directed film Shoshelet Schwartz, for her performance, she was once again nominated for an Ophir Award for best actress. Later that year, she portrayed Anastasia during the first season of the children's television series Rosh Gadol. In 2006, she portrayed Tamara weiss in the third and fourth season of the musical drama series HaShir Shelanu. In 2007, she starred in Avi Nesher's critically acclaimed film The Secrets as Neomi Hess, a curious Haredi teenager who discovers her attraction to another girl at a religious school. On 6 September 2007, in the Israeli 'People of the Year Ceremony', she won the 'Woman of The Year in Cinema' award for her performance in The Secrets. That same year, she portrayed Irena Kovlova in the crime drama series The Arbitrator on Hot 3 channel.

In 2008, she appeared on Israeli comedy television series Kapiot (Spoons) on Channel 2. In 2010, she portrayed Adi in  Kalevet (Rabies), and later appeared on sitcom Naor's Friends. In 2014, she portrayed Silvy in the comedy series Amamiot. Later that year, she co-starred in False Flag and portrayed Asia Brinditch, an Israeli kindergarten teacher who is implicated together with 4 other Israeli citizens in a high-profile kidnapping that is covered by the media all over the world.

In 2016, she portrayed Kinvara in the sixth season of the HBO series Game of Thrones. In November Bukstein won Wolf for the Best Actress award in PÖFF Festival for her role in A Quiet Heart who also won the award for the Best Film.
In 2017, Bukstein appeared in the American TV series Genius, portraying the Russian spy Margarita Konenkova, with whom Albert Einstein had an affair after the death of his second wife.

Theater
In 1998, she appeared in a children's play Tzav Tzav HaMelech (King Turtle Turtle). In 2002, she starred in Leah Goldberg written play Baalat HaArmon (The Palace Owner). In 2005, she played in the drama play Milhama (War) at Habima Theatre, for her performance in the play she won the Israeli Theater Award for 'Most Promising Actress of The Year'. In the Hanukkah holiday of 2007, she played in the musical Narnia at Tel Aviv Performing Arts Center. In 2008, she played in the musical Oliver! at the Beit Lessin Theater. In 2010, she portrayed Hayyah in Joshua Sobol's play Ghetto at the Cameri Theater. She starred as Maria von Trapp in the 2013 Israeli version of the musical The Sound of Music at Tel Aviv Performing Arts Center. Before the pandemic of COVID-19 Bukstein starred as Elle Woods in the Israeli production of Legally Blonde.

Voice acting
In 1994, she voiced Marie in the Hebrew version of the 1970 film The Aristocats. She also narrated and sang the intro song of Dick Bruna's Miffy Storybook Classics: The Original Series which aired that year in Channel 2 (Reshet). In 2002, she voiced Jane in the Hebrew version of Return to Never Land. From 2003 to 2006 she voiced Clover in Totally Spies! on Disney Channel Israel. From 2004 to 2007 She voiced Daphne Blake in Scooby-Doo franchies. She voiced Susan Pevensie in the Hebrew version of The Chronicles of Narnia: The Lion, the Witch and the Wardrobe in 2005 and Princess Selenia in the Hebrew version of Arthur and the Invisibles (2006).

Personal life
Bukstein reportedly dated her HaShir Shelanu co-star, Israeli actor Ran Danker.

She married Israeli real estate developer Dotan Weiner (cousin of Galit Gutman) in 2013. In 2018, they had their first daughter.

She speaks Russian, Hebrew, French, italian and English.

Filmography

Film

Television

Awards and nominations

References

External links

 
 profile on 'edb.co.il' 

1982 births
Living people
Israeli child actresses
Israeli film actresses
20th-century Israeli Jews
21st-century Israeli Jews
Israeli military musicians
Israeli people of Russian-Jewish descent
Israeli television actresses
Israeli voice actresses
Jewish Israeli actresses
Russian emigrants to Israel
20th-century Russian Jews
21st-century Russian Jews
20th-century Israeli actresses
21st-century Israeli actresses